Ko Iso (born April 10, 1987) is a professional Go player.

Biography
Ko became a professional in 2002. He was promoted to 7 dan after making it through the preliminary rounds of the Meijin tournament.

Promotion record

Runners-up

References

External links
 Player page at Japanese Go Association

1987 births
Living people
Taiwanese Go players
Japanese Go players
Sportspeople from Taipei